The  is a Japanese literary award established in 2010 in commemoration of the 120th anniversary of Agatha Christie's birth. The award is presented by Hayakawa Publishing Corporation in association with the Agatha Christie Society, which is chaired by Mathew Pritchard, the grandson of Agatha Christie.

It is the literary award for unpublished mystery novels. The winning work, which is selected from more than 100 entries, is published by Hayakawa Publishing Corporation and the winner receives a prize of 1,000,000 yen.

Winners

See also 
Japanese mystery awards for unpublished novels
 Edogawa Rampo Prize
 Ayukawa Tetsuya Award
 Mephisto Prize
Japanese mystery awards for best works published in the previous year
 Mystery Writers of Japan Award
 Honkaku Mystery Award

References

External links 
 Agatha Christie Award 
 Hayakawa Publishing Corporation 

2010 establishments in Japan
Mystery and detective fiction awards
Japanese literary awards
Awards established in 2010